Bernardo Mota Veiga de Carvalho e Silva (born 10 August 1994), known as Bernardo Silva or simply Bernardo, is a Portuguese professional footballer who plays as an attacking midfielder, forward or a winger for  club Manchester City and the Portugal national team. Silva is considered one of the best midfielders and dribblers  in the world and one of the best Portuguese players due to his prowess, stamina, agility and work-rate.

Born in Lisbon, Silva came through Benfica's youth academy. He began playing for Benfica B in 2013 and was promoted to the first-team in 2014, playing a few minutes with the latter. He was on loan at the Ligue 1 side Monaco during the 2014–15 season, with Les Monégasques making the move permanent in winter 2015. After winning the league title with them in 2017, he was signed by English club Manchester City for a reported fee of £43.5 million. He subsequently won the Premier League and EFL Cup in his first season in England, following this up with a domestic treble the following season. He had a significant role in City becoming the first men's team in England to win a domestic treble, being named Manchester City's Player of the Year in 2019 and being part of the PFA Premier League Team of the Year. Afterwards, Silva was listed among the 30-man shortlist for the Ballon d'Or. In 2020–21, he had a significant role on Manchester City reaching their first UEFA Champions League final.

Silva made his senior debut for Portugal in 2015 after previously being capped by the nations's youth teams at under-19 and under-21 levels. He was chosen in Portugal's squads for the 2017 FIFA Confederations Cup, 2018 FIFA World Cup, 2019 UEFA Nations League Finals, UEFA Euro 2020 and 2022 FIFA World Cup, winning the 2019 tournament on home soil while also being named as the Player of the Tournament.

Club career

Benfica
A product of S.L. Benfica's youth system, Silva played for its ranks, and in 2013 they won the 2012–13 Portuguese Juniors Championship. He made his debut for Benfica B in a Segunda Liga match against Trofense on 10 August 2013 (Matchday 1).

On 19 October 2013, Silva made his debut for Benfica at the age of 19, in a 2013–14 Taça de Portugal third round 1–0 away victory against Campeonato Nacional de Seniores club C.D. Cinfães, coming out of the bench in the 80th minute. His good performance for Benfica B in the 2013–14 Segunda Liga earned him the league's Breakthrough Player of the Year award. He was a member of Benfica's domestic treble-winning team of the 2013–14 season.

Monaco

On 7 August 2014, Silva joined Monaco on one-year loan deal. He made his debut on 17 August in a Ligue 1 away match against Bordeaux, replacing Lucas Ocampos in the second half. On 21 September, he made his first start, in a 1–0 home win against Guingamp. On 14 December, he scored the only goal of a home win against Marseille.

On 20 January 2015, Benfica announced that Silva's economic and sports rights had been sold to Monaco for €15.75 million; he signed a contract for Monaco that would expire on 30 June 2019. On 10 April, he scored twice in a 3–0 away win against Caen. On 10 August 2015, Silva extended his contract by one year, tying him to the club until June 2020.

In the 2016–17 Champions League group stage away match against CSKA Moscow on 18 October 2016, Silva scored Monaco's equalizer in the 87th minute to ensure that the match finished in 1–1 draw. On 15 January 2017, he scored Monaco's last two goals in a 4–1 away win over Marseille to help Monaco move to the top of the Ligue 1 table for the first time since Week 5 of the current Ligue 1 season. The following 29 January, Silva scored an added-time equaliser in the 1–1 draw against reigning league champions Paris Saint-Germain at the Parc des Princes, putting his team on top of the league. He finished the 2016–17 season with 8 goals and 9 assists in the league and 11 goals and 12 assists in 58 matches across all competitions.

Manchester City

2017–2021: Domestic success and European final
The calibre of his performances against Manchester City for Monaco in the UEFA Champions League knockout legs in the 2016–17 season was noted by head coach Pep Guardiola and his backroom staff. On 26 May 2017, Manchester City confirmed the signing of Silva on a five-year contract after passing his medical tests. Although the transfer fee remains undisclosed, it has been reported to amount to €50 million (£43.5 million), which could reach €70 million with add-ons. Silva officially joined the club on 1 July 2017, ahead of the 2017–18 season.

On 13 February 2018, Silva scored his first Champions League goal for the City in a 4–0 away victory against Basel in the first leg of the round of 16 stage. On 5 March, Silva scored the solitary winning goal against Chelsea at home – a key win which put them only three wins away from winning the Premier League title. He established himself as a consistent performer, playing the most matches of any City player in the season up to the end of February 2018. By the end of the season, he had played for Manchester City 53 times in all competitions – the most of any City player that season and helped them to a record 100 points in the Premier League and the EFL Cup.

Silva made 51 appearances for Manchester City during the 2018–19 season, scoring 13 goals and adding 14 assists in all competitions. On 24 April 2019, Silva scored the opening goal for City against Manchester United in the Manchester Derby, and the 2–0 win at Old Trafford put his team on top of the league. Silva's consistent and influential performances helped his team to win Premier League title, filling in Kevin De Bruyne's position who missed the majority of the season with an injury. As a result, he was voted into the PFA Team of the Year alongside four other City players and won the Manchester City Player of the Season award, voted by the fans.

In the 2019–20 season, Silva scored a hat-trick in an 8–0 thrashing of Watford in the Premier League on 21 September. Days later, he was accused of being racist towards his teammate Benjamin Mendy in a tweet which likened the player's appearance to that of a dark-skinned advertising mascot; Mendy said that he was not offended. In November, Silva was banned for one match and fined £50,000 for the tweet. The FA said that Silva did not intend the post to be insulting or in any way racist. In October 2019, Silva was nominated as one amongst 30 candidates for Ballon d´Or.

On 10 January 2021, Silva scored a brace in a 3–0 home win over Championship side Birmingham City in the Third round of the FA Cup. On 20 January 2021, Silva scored his first league goal of the season in a 2–0 home win over Aston Villa. On 24 February 2021, Silva scored his first Champions League goal of the season in a 2–0 away win over Borussia Mönchengladbach in the first leg of the round of 16 tie.

2021–22: Fourth Premier League title
In the start of the 2021–22 season, Manchester City manager Pep Guardiola revealed that Silva was one of three players that wanted to leave the club in the summer transfer window. It was reported that, he was unhappy in Manchester, with Spanish La Liga side Atlético Madrid and Serie A side A.C. Milan being interested in signing him. After failling to leave the club in the transfer window, Silva began displaying impressive performances in the midfield for Manchester City, most notably in the 5–0 victory against Arsenal, scoring the only goal in a 1–0 win over Leicester City, and against Liverpool and Chelsea, being named man of the match in the latter, with manager Pep Guardiola describing Silva as "one of the best players in the world". For his performances, Silva was awarded Manchester City's Player of the Month by the club's supporters for two consecutive months in September and October.

On 6 November, in the Manchester derby, Silva scored City's second goal in a 2–0 victory against Manchester United at Old Trafford. On 24 November, Silva became the first player in the Champions League to register a 100% passing rate, being named man of the match, as he provided an assist for Gabriel Jesus, in City's 2–1 home win against Paris Saint-Germain in a Champions League group stage match, to ensure his team qualification to the round of sixteen. For his performances, Silva was named Manchester City's Player of the Month for November, becoming the first player to win the award in three consecutive months.

On 15 February 2022, Silva scored a brace and provided an assist in a 5–0 away win over Sporting CP in the first leg of the Champions League round of 16 tie, being named man of the match for the second match in a row.

Having spent the majority of his first four seasons in Manchester providing width on the right, he was transformed into the ultimate utility player over the course of this season. Though functionally a central midfielder, he has spent time at both centre forward (he scored from there against Manchester United) and defensive midfield. He ended the season with 13 goals and 7 assists in all competitions.

International career

In 2013, Silva represented Portugal at the 2013 European Under-19 Championship, reaching the semi-finals. For his performances, he was named among the top 10 talents under the age of 19 in Europe by a selection of UEFA reporters.

On 31 March 2015, Silva made his senior debut for Portugal, starting in a 0–2 friendly defeat to Cape Verde in Estoril.

On 27 June 2015, Silva scored Portugal U21s' first goal in a 5–0 win against Germany U21 in the semi-finals of the European Under-21 Championship in Czech Republic. He was left out of the Portuguese squad for the finals of Euro 2016 due to injury.

Silva was selected for the Portugal squad for the 2017 Confederations Cup which was hosted in Russia. He scored the second goal of the match in the group stage of the tournament, a 4–0 win over New Zealand. The national team reached the semi-finals before losing out to Chile in a penalty shootout after a 0–0 draw at the end of regulation time. He missed the third place play-off in which Portugal defeated Mexico 2–1 after extra time.

Silva was named in Portugal's 23-man squad for the 2018 World Cup in Russia. He featured in all 4 matches with Portugal, but was knocked out of the tournament after a 1–2 loss to Uruguay.

Silva was selected for three matches in the 2018–19 UEFA Nations League group stage, scoring a goal in a 3–2 victory against Poland. In the UEFA Nations League Finals, Silva played both matches and registered an assist in each as Portugal won the trophy on home soil, as he went on to be named the tournament's best player.

Silva was named in Portugal's final squad for the delayed UEFA Euro 2020 tournament, appearing in all games of the eventual round of 16-exit to Belgium.

In October 2022, he was named in Portugal's preliminary 55-man squad for the 2022 FIFA World Cup in Qatar, being included in the final 26-man squad for the tournament.

Style of play
Silva is a diminutive, elegant, and creative left-footed playmaker, with a slender build, who is capable of playing in several attacking and midfield positions. Throughout his career, he has been fielded in a variety of roles, including as a winger on either flank (although he favours the right side of the pitch), as a central midfielder, as a deep-lying playmaker, as an attacking midfielder, or even as a second striker; he has also been deployed in a false 9 role, or even as wing-back on occasion. He is mainly known for his technique, acceleration, agility, passing, vision, and dribbling skills, as well as his energy and defensive work-rate, which enables him to cover ground, press opponents, and start attacks after winning back possession. Although he is known for his ability to carry the ball forward, run at defences, and retain possession, he is also known to be an intelligent team player, with a strong personality, who prefers to participate in the build-up of offensive plays rather than undertaking individual dribbling runs. Despite primarily being a creative midfielder, he is also capable of scoring goals himself.

Personal life
Silva's English has been described as "perfect" by the media, partly as a result of his parents sending him to an English-speaking school in Lisbon when he was six years old. In addition to English and his native Portuguese, Silva speaks French and Spanish. His cousin Matilde Fidalgo, also born in 1994, has represented Portugal and Manchester City's women's teams. Silva is a supporter of Portuguese club S.L. Benfica.

Career statistics

Club

International

Portugal score listed first, score column indicates score after each Silva goal.

Honours
Benfica
Primeira Liga: 2013–14
Taça de Portugal: 2013–14
Taça da Liga: 2013–14

Monaco
Ligue 1: 2016–17
Coupe de la Ligue runner-up: 2016–17

Manchester City
Premier League: 2017–18, 2018–19, 2020–21, 2021–22
FA Cup: 2018–19
EFL Cup: 2017–18, 2018–19, 2019–20, 2020–21
FA Community Shield: 2018, 2019
UEFA Champions League runner-up: 2020–21

Portugal U21
UEFA European Under-21 Championship runner-up: 2015

Portugal
UEFA Nations League: 2019
FIFA Confederations Cup third place: 2017

Individual
Segunda Liga Breakthrough Player of the Year: 2013–14
SJPF Segunda Liga Player of the Month: October 2013, December 2013 & January 2014
UEFA European Under-19 Championship Team of the Tournament: 2013
UEFA European Under-21 Championship Team of the Tournament: 2015
UNFP Ligue 1 Player of the Month: January 2017
UNFP Ligue 1 Team of the Year: 2016–17
PFA Team of the Year: 2018–19 Premier League, 2021–22 Premier League
Manchester City Player of the Year: 2018–19
Manchester City Goal of the Season: 2022
Alan Hardaker Trophy: 2019
UEFA Nations League Finals Player of the Tournament: 2019
UEFA Nations League Finals Team of the Tournament: 2019
IFFHS Men's World Team: 2019
 ESM Team of the Year: 2021–22

References

External links

 
 
 

1994 births
Living people
Footballers from Lisbon
Portuguese footballers
Association football midfielders
Association football wingers
S.L. Benfica B players
S.L. Benfica footballers
AS Monaco FC players
Manchester City F.C. players
Liga Portugal 2 players
Primeira Liga players
Ligue 1 players
Premier League players
FA Cup Final players
Portugal youth international footballers
Portugal under-21 international footballers
Portugal international footballers
2017 FIFA Confederations Cup players
2018 FIFA World Cup players
UEFA Euro 2020 players
2022 FIFA World Cup players
UEFA Nations League-winning players
Portuguese expatriate footballers
Expatriate footballers in England
Expatriate footballers in Monaco
Portuguese expatriate sportspeople in England
Portuguese expatriate sportspeople in Monaco